Carolina Rieuwpassa (born 7 February 1949) is an Indonesian former sprinter. She competed in the 100 metres at the 1972 Summer Olympics and the 1976 Summer Olympics.

References

External links
 

1949 births
Living people
Athletes (track and field) at the 1972 Summer Olympics
Athletes (track and field) at the 1976 Summer Olympics
Indonesian female sprinters
Olympic athletes of Indonesia
Sportspeople from Makassar
Asian Games medalists in athletics (track and field)
Asian Games bronze medalists for Indonesia
Athletes (track and field) at the 1970 Asian Games
Medalists at the 1970 Asian Games
Southeast Asian Games medalists in athletics
Southeast Asian Games gold medalists for Indonesia
Southeast Asian Games silver medalists for Indonesia
Competitors at the 1977 Southeast Asian Games
Olympic female sprinters
20th-century Indonesian women
21st-century Indonesian women